The Chapman Stick is an electric musical instrument devised by Emmett Chapman in the early 1970s. A member of the guitar family, the Chapman Stick usually has ten or twelve individually tuned strings and is used to play bass lines, melody lines, chords, or textures. Designed as a fully polyphonic chordal instrument, it can also cover several of these musical parts simultaneously.

The Stick is available with passive or active pickup modules that are plugged into a separate instrument amplifier. With a special synthesizer pickup, it can be used to trigger synthesizers and send MIDI messages to electronic instruments.

Description and playing position

A Stick physically resembles the fretboard of an electric guitar—it is, however, considerably longer and wider and is strung with 8, 10, or 12 strings. Unlike the electric guitar, it is usually played by tapping or fretting the strings, rather than plucking them. Instead of one hand fretting and the other hand plucking, both hands sound notes by striking the strings against the fingerboard "behind" (in guitar parlance, this means a short distance towards the tuning machines) on the appropriate frets for the desired notes. For this reason, it can sound many more notes at once than some other stringed instruments, making it more comparable to a keyboard instrument than to other stringed instruments. This arrangement lends itself to playing many lines at once, and many Stick players have mastered performing bass, chords, and melody lines simultaneously.

Typically, the Chapman Stick is held via a belt-hook and a shoulder strap. The player hooks the instrument onto the belt and places the head and dominant arm through the shoulder strap. The instrument then settles into a position approximately 30 to 40 degrees from vertical, which allows both of the player's hands to naturally and comfortably address the fretboard. The player then hammers onto the strings with the fingertips in the same way that one would strike a piano key. The technique is very similar to that of the piano inasmuch as the player covers both bass and melody notes together with both hands, and each note is struck with one finger of one hand. Typically, one hand plays the melody on the treble strings and the other plays rhythm on the bass strings.

A seated playing position (which keeps the Stick in a similar playing position relative to the player as the standing position) is also popular, wherein a cross-member is laid upon the knees of the seated player and the stick's belthook rests upon the crossmember.

Origins, history, and popular profile

In 1969, jazz guitarist Emmett Chapman developed the two-handed tapping technique (in which both hands play parallel to the frets) and applied it to his playing. At the time, Chapman was playing a 9-string long-scale guitar, but decided to develop a new instrument for use with "free hands" to use the method's full potential. The Chapman Stick took five years to develop, during which Chapman also opted to set up a business to sell it. The first production model of the Stick was launched in 1974. On October 10 of the same year, Chapman brought his instrument to public attention by demonstrating it on the game show What's My Line?

Former Weather Report bassist Alphonso Johnson was among the first musicians to introduce the Chapman Stick to the public. Session player Tony Levin was also an early user and was playing the instrument from the mid-1970s: he would bring it to sessions and tours with Peter Gabriel, and featured it in his work as a member of King Crimson from 1981 onwards. He would also use it with Liquid Tension Experiment and in sessions for bands including Pink Floyd and Yes. Levin formed the band Stick Men, consisting of one drummer and two Stick players.

Recordings that have been influential on Stick players, because of the prominent role the Stick plays, include the 1981 King Crimson album Discipline (played by Tony Levin) and Emmett Chapman's own album Parallel Galaxy. Amy Grant's hit single "Angels" also featured a Stick solo (played by Andy Widders-Ellis).

The Stick made a disguised appearance in David Lynch's film Dune as Gurney Halleck's baliset, although the scene where Halleck (played by Patrick Stewart) plays the instrument was removed from the theatrical version and can only be seen in the extended versions. The piece being played in the scene is from Emmett Chapman's recording of his original song "Back Yard" from a cassette recording.

Wayne Lytle, creator of Animusic, commented that on his piece "Stick Figures", his inspiration for the semi-anthropomorphic bass guitar was the Chapman Stick.

Technical details

Construction

Chapman Sticks have been made from many materials. The first were made from hardwoods, most from ironwood, but some from ebony and other exotic woods, until the early 1980s. The next group was made from an injection-molded polycarbonate resin through 1989. These were followed by one-piece hardwood structures with an adjustable truss rod, and for a time from 2001 to the mid-to-late 2000s (although not currently available), the "Stick XG" (Extended Graphite) was made of structural graphite, continuous strand carbon fiber. Today, they are made from laminated hardwoods (including padauk, Indian rosewood, tarara, maple, wenge, and mahogany), and laminated bamboo, as well as graphite.

In contrast to the guitar or bass, the Stick is set up with very little relief in the fretboard. It is very flat compared to a guitar, which has a slight bow. Combined with a long scale length, stainless steel pyramidal fret rails, very low string action, and very sensitive pickups, this setup is advantageous to the tapping style of play. The rear surface of the instrument is not curved like a guitar neck, but has deep-beveled edges (also a design trademark of the Stick).

Tuning

The original (now called "Classic") tuning consists of five bass strings (six on the Grand Sticks), tuned upwards in all-fifths tuning, with the low string in the middle of the fretboard, and five melody strings (6 on Grand Stick), tuned upwards (this means from lowest-pitched string to highest-pitched string) in all-fourths tuning, again with the low string in the middle of the fretboard.

The hardware is fully adjustable to accommodate any gauge string at any position. On the 36"-scale instrument, notes can range from low C (above B on a 5-string bass) to high D (a whole step below the high E string on guitar). On the two guitar-scale models (Alto Stick and Stick Guitar), the notes range from F below guitar low E to F# above guitar high E.

Tuning configurations may change depending on the player's style: a player playing as a lead instrument will choose an overall higher pitch tuning, with more separation or overlap between the melody and bass courses.

The stringing/tuning configuration of the Chapman Stick is advantageous to the player who wishes to play large, fully voiced chords with close inner-note relationships. In contrast to a standard guitar, where one tends to "run out of options" within a particular fingering, the Stick tuning results in up to four or even five octaves of note choices under each hand's fretting position.

The classic tuning shows another advantage as well: The regular tunings in fourths and fifths remain consistent in each of the two parts of the instrument; regular tunings facilitate learning by beginners, as well as transposition and improvisation by advanced players. Also, the bass/melody division allows microtonal tunings.

The manufacturer's website has more detailed information on tunings.

Electronics
The Stick is available with passive or active pickup modules. Customized Roland GK-3 pickups are available for the treble or bass side of the instrument, allowing the instrument to trigger or control one or two guitar synthesizers such as the Roland GR-20 or Axon AX-100, and also to drive other MIDI instruments or sequencers chained to the guitar synthesizer. The hammer-on style of playing produces a rising waveform transient that is easily tracked by this type of device.

Standard output is two-channel, through a TRS 1/4" phone connector, with bass and melody courses output separately. There are separate volume controls for bass and melody. The ACTV-2 and PASV-4 pickup modules also have mono operation modes.

The Stick can be plugged into any standard guitar amp or bass amplifier, to good effect. However, because of the very high impedance of the passive pickups, an instrument preamp is often employed, especially for full-range amplification systems (PA system, keyboard amps, etc.).

British musician Nick Beggs uses a Grand Stick, fully MIDI-capable of triggering from both bass and melody strings. He has named this modified instrument the "Virtual Stick".

Models
Currently, there are eight models of the Chapman Stick. Some string configurations are mentioned below, but current production models offer any tuning within physical limitations of stringing:

 The Stick (10 strings, 5 melody & 5 bass/6 melody & 4 bass, other custom tunings and set-ups, 36" scale length)
 The Railboard (10 strings, a 1-piece CNC-cut thru-neck aluminum beam with 9 pieces bolted-on including headstock, bridge, new R-Block pickup module, 34" scale)
 Grand Stick (12 strings, 6 melody & 6 bass/7 melody & 5 bass, other custom tunings and set-ups, 36" scale length)
 10-String Grand Stick (10 strings installed on a wooden or laminated bamboo "blanks" for the Grand Stick 12-string model, thus creating a wider fretboard & string spacing for a 10-string Stick. Center-to-center string spacing is 0.350" as opposed to 0.315" on standard 10-string Sticks. The space between the "melody" & "bass" groups of strings is also wider, at 0.500" instead of the standard 0.430". Same 5 melody & 5 bass/6 melody & 4 bass, custom tunings and set-ups & 36" scale length as the standard 10-string Stick)
 Stick Bass (SB8) (8 strings, undivided "straight 4ths" B-Bb bass guitar or B-A electric guitar intervals tuning, standard Stick 4 melody & 4 bass, other custom tunings and set-ups, 36" scale length)
 NS/Stick (8 strings set up for plucking, strumming, or tapping in standard bass or guitar intervals, standard Stick 5 melody & 5 bass, other custom tunings and set-ups; co-invented by Chapman & Ned Steinberger, 34" scale length)
 Alto Stick (10 strings, 5 melody + 5 accompaniment, with shorter scale length for a more guitar-like range, 26.5" scale length)
 Stick Guitar (12 strings, 2 groups of 6, with shorter scale length for a more guitar-like range, 26.5" scale length)

Currently, the Stick, Grand Stick, and Stick Bass are 36"-scale, but the older production models were 34" scale.

Stick Enterprises has also manufactured some custom and limited-run instruments:
 SB7 Stick Bass – Original "Stick Bass" model with string-spacing close to the current 10-string Chapman Stick, which is narrower than the SB8 8-string Stick Bass. 2 Bartolini bass pickups (1 "Soapbar" & 1 "Single Coil"-sized: only 1 selectable at a time) with mono-only output as opposed to virtually all the previously built and current to the original & upgraded over time passive "Stickup", newer active EMG "ACTV-2" Block, passive Villex "PASV-4" and "R-Block" railboard pickup modules, all of which have stereo-or-mono output. Only one production run completed in 1996–97 until replaced by the more Stick-like SB8 in March 1998. Only 1 Production Run of this particular Stick model was built before being replaced by the SB8 Stick Bass.

 The Acoustick – an acoustic version of the Chapman Stick made for Bob Culbertson.

 StickXBL – A prototype Stick with body construction by BassLab using a hollow "tunable composite" material. Only a small number of these prototypes exist.

List of notable players and ensembles
 Carlos Alonso, leader of Glueleg
 Jeff Ament of Pearl Jam
 John Balance of Coil and Current 93
 Nick Beggs (Kajagoogoo, Ellis, Beggs & Howard, John Paul Jones, Nik Kershaw, Howard Jones, Iona, Steve Hackett, Steven Wilson, Lifesigns)
 Blue Man Group
 Zeta Bosio of Soda Stereo
 Brian Bourne
 Terry Burrows author and musician
 Emmett Chapman inventor of the Chapman Stick Touchboard and the Free Hands Two-Handed Tapping Technique
 Guillermo Cides solo Stick performer
 Bob Culbertson solo Stick performer
 Peter Gifford plays Chapman Stick on the tracks 'Sleep' and 'Who Can Stand in the Way' on the Midnight Oil album Red Sails in the Sunset and in concert
 Trey Gunn played Chapman Stick with Robert Fripp, David Sylvian, Sunday All Over the World, King Crimson and UKZ
 Paige Haley of  Orgy
 Greg Howard solo and on the Dave Matthews Band album Before These Crowded Streets
 Alphonso Johnson Weather Report, Santana, Gregg Rolie Band
 Tony Levin solo and with Peter Gabriel, King Crimson, Yes, Anderson Bruford Wakeman Howe (notably on live renditions of Close to the Edge), Pink Floyd, Stick Men, and Liquid Tension Experiment
 Sean Malone of Cynic and Gordian Knot
 Mark McCullough with Red Wanting Blue
 John Myung of Dream Theater and Gordian Knot
 Mike Oldfield plays Chapman Stick on his album The Songs of Distant Earth (and in some multimedia video clips on the extended CD) (although Oldfield plays with pick as opposed to two-hand technique)
 Pino Palladino on Paul Young's No Parlez
 Jeff Pearce solo and in concert with William Ackerman
 Don Schiff solo and with Lana Lane and Rocket Scientists
 Akın Ünver, Solo Stick player from Ankara, Turkey
 Fariz RM

See also
 Left-handed tunings, which are called "inverse tunings" in the Chapman Stick community
 Touch guitar
 Warr Guitar
 Megatar

References

External links

Stick.com - Official Site
Basic Information about the Stick in Spanish and English

Amplified instruments
Fretboard tapping instruments
1970s introductions